Mosayyeb Mahalleh (also Romanized as Moşayyeb Maḩalleh; also known as Masaf and Moşaf) is a village in Tuskacheshmeh Rural District, in the Central District of Galugah County, Mazandaran Province, Iran. At the 2006 census, its population was 91, in 23 families.

References 

Populated places in Galugah County